The Upper Austrian Football Association (German: Oberösterreichischer Fußballverband; OFV) is the umbrella organization of the football clubs of the Austrian state Upper Austria. The OFV was founded in 1919 and has its headquarters in Linz.

The StFV is one of 8 regional organizations of the Austrian Football Association (ÖFB).

References

External links
 OFV website 

Football in Austria
Sport in Upper Austria